The 1997 Supercoppa Italiana was a match contested by Juventus, the 1996–97 Serie A winner, and Vicenza, the 1996–97 Coppa Italia winner. 
It was the third appearance for Juventus, after the victory in 1995 and the defeat in 1990, whereas it was Vicenza's first appearance.

Match details

References

1997
Supercoppa 1997
Supercoppa 1997
Supercoppa Italiana